Micrologus  is a genus of sea snails, marine gastropod mollusks in the family Pisaniidae.

Species
Species within the genus Micrologus include:
 Micrologus mochatinctus Fraussen & Rosado, 2011

References

 Fraussen K. & Rosado J. (2011) The Cantharus group (Gastriopoda: Buccinidae) on Almirante Leite Bank (Mozambique) with description of two new species and one new genus. Novapex 12(3-4): 73–79.

Gastropod genera
Pisaniidae